Carrickaness is a small village and townland in County Armagh, Northern Ireland. In the 2001 Census it had a population of 99 people. It is within the Armagh City and District Council area.

References 

NI Neighbourhood Information System

See also 
List of villages in Northern Ireland

Villages in County Armagh
Townlands of County Armagh